The International Bodyboarding Association (IBA) was the governing body for professional Bodyboarders and is dedicated to showcasing the world's best talent in a variety of progressive formats.

IBA ran the bodyboarding World Tour from 2003 - 2013.

In 2020, the International Bodyboarding Corporation was created in order to run the bodyboarding world tour. For the period of 2020 to 2021, the IBC couldn't effectively run a tour due to the COVID-19 pandemic which impacted global travel. The IBC Bodyboarding World Tour consists of 6 divisions: Men, Women, Dropknee, Junior Men, Junior Women and Master Women.

History
2003 - 2013

See also

References

External links
 
 https://magicseaweed.com/news/the-resurrection-of-competitive-bodyboarding/7376/

Bodyboarding
International sports organizations